Dysart or Dysert may refer to:

Places

Ireland
 Dysart and Ruan, a Catholic parish in County Clare
 Dysart (civil parish), a civil parish in County Westmeath
 Dysart, County Westmeath, a village in County Westmeath
 Dysert, County Clare, a civil parish in County Clare
 Dysart, County Roscommon, a village in County Roscommon
 Diseart Diarmad, (English:Castledermot), a village in County Kildare

Scotland
Dysart, Fife

United States
Dysart, Iowa
Dysart, Pennsylvania

Australia
Dysart, Queensland
Dysart, Tasmania

Canada
 The United Townships of Dysart, Dudley, Harcourt, Guilford, Harburn, Bruton, Havelock, Eyre and Clyde, known for short as Dysart et al, Ontario
Dysart, Saskatchewan

People
Earl of Dysart, a Scottish peer
Elbert Dysart Botts (1893–1962), American highway engineer ("Botts' dots")
Richard Dysart (1929–2015), American actor
Tommy Dysart (1935–2022), Scots-born Australian actor
William Dysart (1929–2002), Scottish actor
Fiction
Martin Dysart, a character in Equus

Other
Dysart Arms, a former public house in SW London
Dysart Buildings, Nantwich, an 18th-century terrace in Nantwich, England